Oscar Tusquets Blanca, (born 1941 in Barcelona) is a Spanish architect.

Selected works 
Urbanism
 Del Liceu al Seminari, 1980-81
 Convent dels Àngels area, 1983
 Avinguda de la Catedral, 1986
 Olympic Village, 1988-92

Books
 Más que discutible (1994) 
 Todo es comparable (1998) 
 Dios lo ve (2000)
 Dalí y otros amigos (2003)
 Contra la desnudez (2007)

References 

1941 births
Living people
People from Barcelona
Architects from Catalonia
Date of birth missing (living people)